Megaherpystis is a genus of moths belonging to the subfamily Olethreutinae of the family Tortricidae.

Species
Megaherpystis agmatophora Diakonoff, 1989
Megaherpystis eusema Diakonoff, 1969
Megaherpystis melanoneura (Meyrick, 1912)

See also
List of Tortricidae genera

References

External links
tortricidae.com

Eucosmini
Tortricidae genera